This is a list of French films that are scheduled to release in 2023, including co-productions with other countries.

Box office & Budgets

Domestic 
The highest-grossing French films released in 2023, by domestic box office, are as follows:

Worldwide 
The highest-grossing French films released in 2023, by worldwide box office, are as follows:

Most Expensive Films 
The most expensive French films of 2023 are as follows:

Theatrical Profitability

Release Date Changes 
In late January 2023, A Love Story was pushed back from March 29th to April 12th. Shortly thereafter in early February 2023, Apaches: Gang of Paris was pushed back from February 22nd to March 29th, Loving Memories from March 22nd to April 5th, Alma Viva from March 29th to April 12th and  a week from May 3rd to the 10th, while Serial Driver was brought forward from April 26th to March 29th.

January–March 
⌀ Denotes a film that was publicly screened prior to 2023, be it through film festivals, premieres or releases in other countries† Denotes a film released through a streaming service, not theatrically‡ Denotes a film primarily not in the French language

April–June 
⌀ Denotes a film that was publicly screened prior to 2023, be it through film festivals, premieres or releases in other countries‡ Denotes a film primarily not in the French language

July–September

October–December

TBA 
† Denotes a film released through a streaming service, not theatrically‡ Denotes a film primarily not in the French language

Notes

References

2023
French